Paradeep railway station is a major railway station in Jagatsinghpur district, Odisha. Its code is PRDP. It serves Paradeep city. It is the biggest railway station in Jagatsinghpur district. The station consists of three platforms. It is one of the most important Railway station of Eastern coast of India.

Major trains 

Some of the important trains that run from Paradeep are:

Originating trains :-

58402 Paradeep - Cuttack 
passenger

58406  Paradeep - Cuttack fast passenger

68436  Paradeep - Cuttack MEMU

18413  Paradeep - Puri intercity express

22809  Paradeep - Visakhapatnam weekly SF express

22814  Paradeep - Santragachi weekly SF express

Terminating train :-

58401  Cuttack - Paradeep passenger

58405  Cuttack - Paradeep fast passenger

68435  Cuttack - Paradeep MEMU

18414  Puri - Paradeep intercity express

22810  Visakhapatnam - Paradeep weekly SF express

22813  Santragachi - Paradeep weekly SF express

References

Railway stations in Jagatsinghpur district
Khurda Road railway division
Transport in Paradeep